This is the Operation Telic order of battle, which lists the British forces that took part in Operation Telic, including
the 2003 Invasion of Iraq,
subsequent operations during the occupation and military government of the country, and
stabilisation operations under the Iraqi Interim Government and the Iraqi Transitional Government.

The Invasion (Operation TELIC I)
From January 2003 to 11 July 2003:
Senior British Military Representative and Deputy Commanding General, Multinational Force, Iraq: Major-General Freddie Viggers (May 2003 to July 2003)

Maritime forces
British Maritime Component Commander - Rear Admiral David Snelson (January 2003 to April 2003)
British Maritime Component Commander - Major General Tony Milton (April 2003 to July 2003)
Commander Amphibious Task Group - Commodore Jamie Miller
HMS Ark Royal (Flagship)
4 Sea King ASaC7s of A Flight, 849 Naval Air Squadron
5 Chinook HC2s of No. 18 Squadron RAF
HMS Ocean
10 Sea King HC4s of 845 Naval Air Squadron
6 Gazelle FAA Gazelle AH1 of 847 Naval Air Squadron
6 Lynx AH7 of 847 Naval Air Squadron
HMS Cardiff
1 Lynx HAS8 of 815 Naval Air Squadron
HMS Liverpool
1 Lynx HAS3 of 815 Naval Air Squadron
HMS Edinburgh
1 Lynx of 815 Naval Air Squadron
HMS York
1 Lynx of 815 Naval Air Squadron
HMS Chatham
2 Lynx of 815 Naval Air Squadron
HMS Richmond (to July 2003)
1 Lynx HMA8 of 815 Naval Air Squadron
HMS Marlborough
1 Lynx of 815 Naval Air Squadron
HMS Sandown
HMS Grimsby
HMS Bangor
HMS Blyth
HMS Ledbury
HMS Brocklesby
HMS Roebuck
HMS Scott
HMS Splendid
HMS Turbulent

Support vessels of the Royal Fleet Auxiliary
RFA Sir Bedivere
RFA Sir Galahad
RFA Sir Percivale
RFA Sir Tristram
RFA Argus
5 Sea King HAS6s of 820 Naval Air Squadron
RFA Bayleaf
RFA Brambleleaf
RFA Orangeleaf
RFA Grey Rover
RFA Fort Austin
RFA Fort Rosalie
RFA Fort Victoria
5 Merlin HM1s of 814 Naval Air Squadron
RFA Diligence
2 Lynxes of 814 Naval Air Squadron ashore in Bahrain

Air forces

British Air Forces Component Commander - Air-Vice Marshal Glenn Torpy
 Tornado GR4 Wing 1 - 18 Tornado GR4s and GR4As at Ali Al Salem Air Base, Kuwait
Part of No. II Squadron
Part of No. IX Squadron
Part of No. XIII Squadron
Part of No. 31 Squadron
Part of No. 617 Squadron
Tornado GR4 Wing 2 - 12 Tornado GR4s at Al Udeid Air Base, Qatar
Part of No. 12 Squadron
Part of No. 617 Squadron
Harrier Wing 1 - 10 Harrier GR7s
Part of No. I Squadron
Part of No. 3 Squadron
Harrier Wing 2 - 8 Harrier GR7s
Part of No. IV Squadron at Al Jaber, Kuwait
Leuchars Fighter Wing - 14 Tornado F3s at Prince Sultan in Saudi Arabia
Part of No. 43 Squadron
Part of No. 111 Squadron
Nimrod MR2 Wing - 6 Nimrod MR2s
Part of No. 120 Squadron
Part of No. 201 Squadron
Part of No. 206 Squadron
Tristar Detachment - 4 Tristars of No. 216 Squadron
VC10 Wing - 7 VC-10s at Prince Sultan Air Base in Saudi Arabia
Part of No. 10 Squadron
Part of No. 101 Squadron
VC10 (for Aeromedical Evacuation) - 1 VC10 C1K at RAF Akrotiri from No. 10 Squadron
Sentry Wing - 4 Sentry AEW1s
Part of No. VIII Squadron
Part of No. 23 Squadron
BAe 125 Detachment - 3 BAe 125s of No. XXXII Squadron
Hercules Wing - 6 Hercules
Canberra Detachment - 2 Canberra PR9s of No. 39 (1 PRU) Squadron (a photo-reconnaissance unit) Azraq Air Base, Jordan
Nimrod R1 Detachment - 1 Nimrod R1 of No. 51 Squadron
Tactical Communications Wing.
Tactical Supply Wing.
Royal Air Force Regiment
No 3 RAF Force Protection Wing HQ.
No 4 RAF Force Protection Wing HQ.
No 1 (Field) Squadron RAF Regiment (Ali Al Salem airbase, then attached to 42 Commando RM).
No II (Para) Squadron RAF Regiment.
No 16 (GBAD) Squadron RAF Regiment.
No 51 (Field) Squadron RAF Regiment (incorporating elements of 63 (Field) Squadron RAF Regiment (the Queen's Colour Squadron)). 
Elements of 2503 (City of Lincoln), 2622 (Highland), 2625 (County of Cornwall) Squadrons Royal Auxiliary Air Force Regiment.
Joint Chemical Biological Radiological and Nuclear Regiment.
No 5131(Bomb Disposal) Squadron, as part of the Joint Force EOD Group

27 helicopters were also sent to the area, a mixture of Pumas, Chinooks and Merlins, although the breakdown of types within that number is yet to be determined. Beyond the Hercules aircraft that were based in theatre, virtually the whole of the rest of the Hercules fleet, the C-17 fleet, and those Tristars and VC10s that had remained based in the UK were involved in transport operations to and from the Persian Gulf.

Ground forces

GOC 1st Armoured Division: Major General Robin Brims (February 2003 to May 2003) 
GOC 1st Armoured Division: Major General Peter Wall (May 2003 to July 2003)
1st Armoured Division Headquarters and Signal Regiment
1st The Queen's Dragoon Guards
12th Regiment, Royal Artillery
1st Battalion, The Duke of Wellington's Regiment (West Riding)
28 Regiment Royal Engineers
1 General Support Regiment, Royal Logistic Corps
2 Close Support Regiment, Royal Logistic Corps
2 Battalion Royal Electrical and Mechanical Engineers
3 Battalion Royal Electrical and Mechanical Engineers
1 Close Support Medical Regiment
5 General Support Medical Regiment
1 Regiment Royal Military Police
A (Royal Wiltshire Yeomanry) Squadron and W (Westminster Dragoons) Squadron, Royal Yeomanry
Elements of 5 (STA) Royal Regiment of Artillery
Elements of 33 (EOD) Regiment Royal Engineers
Elements of 32 Regiment Royal Artillery - Phoenix Unmanned Aerial Vehicles
Elements of 30 Signal Regiment
Elements of 14 Signal Regiment
3 Commando Brigade - Brigadier Jim Dutton
Headquarters 3 Commando Brigade
59 Independent (Commando) Squadron Royal Engineers
131 Independent (Commando) Squadron Royal Engineers (Volunteer)
9 (Commando) Assault Squadron
539 (Commando) Assault Squadron
29 (Commando) Regiment Royal Artillery - 18 105 mm howitzers
40 Commando, Royal Marines
42 Commando, Royal Marines
7 Armoured Brigade - Brigadier Graham Binns
7 Armoured Brigade Headquarters and Signal Squadron
32 (Armoured) Regiment Royal Engineers (with 25 Armoured Engineer Squadron attached from 38 Engineer Regiment)
3rd Regiment Royal Horse Artillery - 32 AS-90 155 mm howitzers
Royal Scots Dragoon Guards (Carabiniers and Greys) battlegroup, 42 Challenger 2s, 28 Warrior Tracked Armoured Vehicles (Warriors)
1st Battalion Irish Guards
2nd Royal Tank Regiment battlegroup, including elements of 1st Battalion The Light Infantry - 42 Challenger 2s, 28 Warriors
The Black Watch (Royal Highland Regiment) battlegroup, including elements of The Royal Scots Dragoon Guards and 2nd Royal Tank Regiment- 28 Challenger 2s, 42 Warriors
1st Battalion Royal Regiment of Fusiliers battlegroup, including elements of Queen's Royal Lancers - 14 Challenger 2s, 42 Warriors
16 Air Assault Brigade - Brigadier 'Jacko' Page
16 Air Assault Brigade Headquarters
D Squadron, Household Cavalry Regiment
216 Parachute Squadron Royal Signals
Pathfinder Platoon
1st Battalion, Royal Irish Regiment (27th (Inniskillings), 83rd, 87th and The Ulster Defence Regiment)
1st Battalion, The Parachute Regiment
3rd Battalion, The Parachute Regiment
7th Parachute Regiment Royal Horse Artillery
9 Parachute Squadron Royal Engineers
23 (Air Assault) Engineer Regiment
7 Air Assault Battalion Royal Electrical and Mechanical Engineers
13 Air Assault Support Regiment Royal Logistic Corps
16 Close Support Medical Regiment
156 Provost Company Royal Military Police

Joint assets
National Support Element
102 Logistic Brigade - Brigadier Shaun Cowlam
Headquarters 102 Logistic Brigade
2 Signal Regiment
39 Engineer Regiment
33 Field Hospital
34 Field Hospital
202 Field Hospital (Volunteer)
4 General Support Medical Regiment
3 Battalion Royal Electrical and Mechanical Engineers
6 Supply Regiment Royal Logistic Corps
7 Transport Regiment Royal Logistic Corps
10 Transport Regiment Royal Logistic Corps (attached from 101 Logistic Brigade)
17 Port and Maritime Regiment Royal Logistic Corps
23 Pioneer Regiment Royal Logistic Corps
168 Pioneer Regiment Royal Logistics Corps (101 Squadron)
24 Regiment Royal Logistic Corps
5 Regiment Royal Military Police
Elements of 11 Explosive Ordnance Disposal Regiment
Joint Helicopter Force Headquarters
3 Regiment Army Air Corps
Elements of 21 Signal Regiment (AS)
Elements of No. 662 Squadron - Lynx AH7s and Gazelle AH1s
Elements of No. 663 Squadron - Lynx AH7s and Gazelle AH1s
Elements of No. 653 Squadron - Lynx AH9s
HMS Ark Royal
4 Sea King AsaC7s of Flight A 849 Naval Air Squadron
5 Chinook HC2s of No. 18 Squadron RAF
HMS Ocean
10 Sea King HC4s of 845 Naval Air Squadron
6 Gazelle AH1 of 847 Naval Air Squadron
6 Lynx AH7 of 847 Naval Air Squadron
Chinook Wing
No. 7 Squadron RAF
No. 18 Squadron RAF
No. 27 Squadron RAF
Puma Detachment
No. 33 Squadron RAF
Merlin detachment (1419 flt)
No. 28 Squadron RAF

Notes
When a battalion is referred to as a battlegroup, it is not purely made up of units from the parent unit, but is an integrated team, combining armoured units with tanks, and mechanised infantry with infantry fighting vehicles.

Also, whilst 16 Air Assault Brigade is apparently the only fighting brigade listed with its own organic helicopter support in this order of battle, 3 Commando Brigade had the helicopters on board Ocean and Ark Royal to call upon, and 7 Armoured Brigade wasn't really air mobile as a formation. There were also the RAF Pumas and Chinooks mentioned above for transport purposes.

Special Forces elements of the British Army (Special Air Service) and Royal Marines (Special Boat Service) were also deployed but as the British government policy is not to comment on special forces activity, the exact details or elements deployed are officially unconfirmed.

The contribution of reservists to the deployment (some 9,500 of the 46,000 personnel involved in the warfighting phase and its immediate aftermath, the vast majority from the Territorial Army, and in significant number in the subsequent roulements) is understated by the order of battle, as the only units to deploy in their entirety were 202 Field Hospital (with augmentees from the other TAVR Field Hospitals), 131 Independent Commando Squadron of the Royal Engineers as well as A (Royal Wiltshire Yeomanry) Squadron and W (Westminster Dragoons) Squadron of the Royal Yeomanry. The remainder were augmentees, called up individually from their units (which therefore do not feature in the order of battle) and employed to bring many of the units listed above up to their war-fighting strength.

Finally, 3 Commando Brigade had a United States Marine Corps unit, 15th MEU under its command in the initial stages of the war. This went back to American command around 25 March.

Roulements

1st Armoured Division remained in theatre, controlling UK ground forces until June 2003, when 3rd Mechanised Division's HQ arrived in theatre to take command of British forces. From December 2003 a series of composite HQs were established.

1st Roulement (Operation TELIC II)
From 11 July 2003 to 4 November 2003:
Senior British Military Representative and Deputy Commanding General, Multinational Force, Iraq: Major-General Freddie Viggers (July 2003 to September 2003)
Senior British Military Representative and Deputy Commanding General, Multinational Force, Iraq: Major-General Andrew Figgures (September 2003 to November 2003)
GOC 3rd (UK) Mechanised Division: Major General Graeme Lamb (July 2003 to November 2003)
3rd Mechanised Division Headquarters and Signal Regiment
10 Field Squadron (Air Support), 39 Engineer Regiment
3 Regiment, Royal Military Police
3 Close Support Regiment, Royal Logistic Corps
3 Close Support Medical Regiment, Royal Army Medical Corps
5 Battalion, Royal Electrical and Mechanical Engineers
Elements of 5 Regiment Royal Artillery
Elements of 7 Signal Regiment
Elements of 14 Signal Regiment
Elements of 30 Signal Regiment
Elements of 4 General Support Regiment, Royal Logistic Corps
Elements of 4 General Support Medical Regiment, Royal Army Medical Corps
Elements of 52nd Lowland Regiment (Territorial Army)
Elements of East of England Regiment (Territorial Army)
Elements of Tyne-Tees Regiment (Volunteers)
19 Mechanised Brigade
19 Mechanised Brigade Headquarters and 209 Signal Squadron
40 Regiment, Royal Artillery
38 Engineer Regiment
1st Battalion, The Queen's Lancashire Regiment
1st Battalion, King's Own Scottish Borderers
1st Battalion, The King's Regiment
2nd Battalion, The Light Infantry
1st Battalion, The Royal Green Jackets
Elements of The Light Dragoons
Elements of the Queen's Royal Lancers
Elements of 2nd Royal Tank Regiment
Elements of Royal Monmouthshire Royal Engineers (Militia)
National Support Element
101 Logistic Brigade
101 Logistics Brigade Headquarters and Signal Squadron
27 Transport Regiment,(attached 236 Squadron RLC(V)Royal Logistic Corps
9 Supply Regiment, Royal Logistic Corps
168 Pioneer Regiment, Royal Logistic Corps
4 Regiment, Royal Military Police
33 Field Hospital
Elements from 17 Port and Maritime Regiment, Royal Logistics Corps
Elements from 29 Regiment, Royal Logistic Corps
Elements from 11 Explosive Ordnance Disposal Regiment, Royal Logistic Corps
Elements from 1 Postal & Courier Service Group
15 Field Support Squadron Royal Engineers Op Telic 2 & 3
Maritime Contribution
HMS Cardiff (Handed over to HMS Richmond)
HMS Richmond (to July 2003)
HMS Sutherland (July 2003-October 2003)
HMS Norfolk (October 2003-March 2004)
HMS Kent
RFA Diligence
RFA Brambleleaf

2nd Roulement (Operation TELIC III)
From: 4 November 2003 to 25 April 2004:
Senior British Military Representative and Deputy Commanding General, Multinational Force, Iraq: Major-General Andrew Figgures (November 2003 to March 2004)
Senior British Military Representative and Deputy Commanding General, Multinational Force, Iraq: Lieutenant-General John McColl (March 2004 to April 2004)
GOC 3rd (UK) Mechanised Division: Major General Graeme Lamb (November 2003 to December 2003)
GOC Multi-National Division (South-East): Major General Andrew Stewart (December 2003 to April 2004)
16 Signals Regiment
Elements from 14 Signals Regiment
Elements from 30 Signals Regiment
20 Armoured Brigade
20 Armoured Brigade Headquarters and Signal Squadron
The Queen's Royal Hussars
26 Regiment Royal Artillery
35 Engineer Regiment
1st Battalion, The Light Infantry
1st Battalion, The Royal Regiment of Wales (24th/41st Foot)
2nd Battalion, The Parachute Regiment
1st Battalion, The Royal Scots (The Royal Regiment)
1st Battalion, Argyll and Sutherland Highlanders (Princess Louise's)
Cambrai Company The London Regiment
Elements of 73 Engineer Regiment
Elements of the West Midlands Regiment
Elements of The Royal Rifle Volunteers
Elements of The East of England Regiment (Militia)
Elements of The 9th/12th Royal Lancers
Elements of Royal Monmouthshire Royal Engineers (Militia)
National Support Element
4 General Support Regiment, Royal Logistic Corps
22 Field Hospital
Elements of 33 Engineer Regiment (Explosive Ordnance Disposal)
Elements of 1 Regiment, Royal Military Police
Elements of 10 Transport Regiment, Royal Logistic Corps
Elements of 11 Explosive Ordnance Disposal Regiment, Royal Logistic Corps
Elements of 17 Port & Maritime Regiment, Royal Logistic Corps
Elements of 23 Pioneer Regiment, Royal Logistic Corps
Elements of 24 Regiment, Royal Logistic Corps
Elements of 5 General Support Medical Regiment, Royal Army Medical Corps
 15 Field Support Squadron Royal Engineers Roulemented by 45 Field Support Squadron January 2004
Maritime Contribution
HMS Kent
HMS Norfolk (October 2003-March 2004)
HMS Grafton (March 2004-July 2004)
RFA Bayleaf

3rd Roulement (Operation TELIC IV)
From 25 April 2004 to 1 November 2004:
Senior British Military Representative and Deputy Commanding General, Multinational Force, Iraq: Lieutenant-General John McColl (April 2004 to October 2004)
Senior British Military Representative and Deputy Commanding General, Multinational Force, Iraq: Lieutenant-General John Kiszely (October 2004 to November 2004)
GOC Multi-National Division (South-East): Major General Andrew Stewart (April 2004 to July 2004)
GOC Multi-National Division (South-East): Major General Bill Rollo (July 2004 to November 2004)
16 Signals Regiment
Elements from 14 Signals Regiment
Elements from 30 Signals Regiment
Elements of 52nd Lowland Regiment (TA)
Messines Coy from The London Regiment (TA)
Elements of the Royal Yeomanry (TA)
Elements of the Lancastrian and Cumbrian Volunteers (TA)
Elements of the Royal Irish Rangers
1 Mechanised Brigade
1 Mechanised Brigade Headquarters and Signal Squadron
1st Regiment Royal Horse Artillery
22 Engineer Regiment
Queen's Royal Lancers
1st Battalion, The Princess of Wales's Royal Regiment
1st Battalion, Royal Welch Fusiliers
1st Battalion, 22nd (Cheshire) Regiment
1st Battalion, Royal Highland Fusiliers (Princess Margaret's Own Glasgow and Ayrshire Regiment)
1st Battalion, The Argyll and Sutherland Highlanders (Princess Louise's)
Elements of The Household Cavalry Regiment
Elements of the Honourable Artillery Company
Elements of The Rifle Volunteers
National Support Element
8 Transport Regiment, Royal Logistic Corps
207 (V) Field Hospital relieved in 2004
UK Medical Group
256 (City of London) Field Hospital (V)
Close Support Squadron, Royal Army Medical
Phoenix Battery, 32 Regiment, Royal Artillery Corps
Elements of 33 Engineer Regiment (Explosive Ordnance Disposal)
Elements of 1 Regiment, Military Police
Elements of 6 Supply Regiment, Royal Logistic Corps
Elements of 11 Explosive Ordnance Disposal Regiment, Royal Logistic Corps
Elements of 24 Regiment, Royal Logistic Corps
Elements of 29 Regiment, Royal Logistic Corps
Elements of Scottish Transport Regiment, Royal Logistic Corps (Volunteers)
Elements of 1 General Support Medical Regiment, Royal Army Medical Corps
Elements of 104 (V) Regiment, Royal Artillery
Elements of 6 Battalion, Royal Electrical and Mechanical Engineers
Maritime contribution
HMS Grafton (March 2004-July 2004)
HMS Somerset (July 2004-November 2004)
HMS Echo
RFA Bayleaf

4th Roulement (Operation TELIC V)
From 1 November 2004 to 30 April 2005:
Senior British Military Representative and Deputy Commanding General, Multinational Force, Iraq: Lieutenant-General John Kiszely (November 2004 to April 2005)
GOC Multi-National Division (South-East): Major General Bill Rollo (November 2004 to January 2005)
GOC Multi-National Division (South-East): Major General Jonathon Riley (January 2005 to April 2005)
4 Armoured Brigade
4 Armoured Brigade Headquarters and Signal Squadron
4th Regiment, Royal Artillery
Phoenix Battery, 32 Regiment, Royal Artillery
21 Engineer Regiment
Field Support Squadron, 28 Engineer Regiment
1st The Queen's Dragoon Guards
The Royal Dragoon Guards
1st Battalion, Scots Guards
1st Battalion, Welsh Guards
1st Battalion, the Duke of Wellington's Regiment (West Riding)
1st Battalion, the Black Watch (Royal Highland Regiment) (detached from UK operational area from end of October 2004 to south-east of Baghdad to support 24th Marine Expeditionary Unit)
40 Commando, Royal Marines
Elements of the Honourable Artillery Company
East and West Riding Regiment
National Support Element
1 Battalion REME
Elements of 7 Transport Regiment, Royal Logistic Corps
Squadron from General Support Medical Regiment
Maritime Contribution
HMS Somerset (July 2004-?)
HMS Cumberland
HMS Echo
RFA Bayleaf
Air Contribution
Detachment of No. 10 Squadron RAF
Detachment of No. 14 Squadron RAF
Detachment of No. 24 Squadron RAF
Detachment of No. 30 Squadron RAF
Detachment of No. 32 Squadron RAF
Detachment of RAF Kinloss Nimrod MR2 Wing
Joint Helicopter Force?Iraq
No. 51 Squadron RAF Regiment

5th Roulement (Operation TELIC VI)
From 30 April 2005 to 31 October 2005:
Senior British Military Representative and Deputy Commanding General, Multinational Force, Iraq: Lieutenant-General Robin Brims (April 2005 to October 2005)
GOC Multi-National Division (South-East): Major General James Dutton (April 2005 to October 2005)
12 Mechanised Brigade
12 Mechanised Brigade Headquarters and Signal Squadron
19th Regiment, Royal Artillery
Phoenix Battery, 32 Regiment, Royal Artillery
Surveillance and Target Acquisition Patrols Troop from the Honourable Artillery Company
106 (Yeomanry) Regiment, Royal Artillery
26 Engineer Regiment
Field Support Squadron, 28 Engineer Regiment
The King's Royal Hussars
The Light Dragoons
1st Battalion, Coldstream Guards
1st Battalion, the Royal Anglian Regiment
1st Battalion, the Royal Regiment of Wales (24th/41st Foot)
1st Battalion, the Staffordshire Regiment (The Prince of Wales's)
1st Battalion, the Royal Irish Regiment (27th (Inniskillings), 83rd, 87th and The Ulster Defence Regiment)
East of England Regiment
Royal Rifle Volunteers
National Support Element
4 Battalion REME
3 Close Support Regiment, Royal Logistic Corps
Squadron from General Support Medical Regiment
Maritime Contribution
HMS Marlborough (July 2004-March 2005)
HMS Argyll (March 2005-August 2005)
HMS Echo (to May 2005)
HMS Scott
RFA Bayleaf
RFA Diligence
Air Contribution
Detachment of No. 10 Squadron RAF
Detachment of No. 101 Squadron RAF
Detachment of No. 14 Squadron RAF
Detachment of No. 24 Squadron RAF
Detachment of No. 30 Squadron RAF
Detachment of No. 32 Squadron RAF
Detachment of RAF Kinloss Nimrod MR2 Wing
Joint Helicopter Force?Iraq
No. 34 Squadron RAF Regiment

6th Roulement (Operation TELIC VII)
From 1 November 2005 to 9 May 2006:
Senior British Military Representative and Deputy Commanding General, Multinational Force, Iraq: Lieutenant-General Nick Houghton (November 2005 to March 2006)
Senior British Military Representative and Deputy Commanding General, Multinational Force, Iraq: Lieutenant-General Robert Fry (March 2006 to May 2006)
GOC - Multi-National Division (South-East): Major General John Cooper (November 2005 to May 2006)
7 Armoured Brigade
7 Armoured Brigade Headquarters and Signal Squadron
Phoenix Battery, 32 Regiment, Royal Artillery
3rd Regiment, Royal Horse Artillery
32 Engineer Regiment
9th/12th Royal Lancers (The Prince of Wales's)
2nd Royal Tank Regiment
The Royal Scots Dragoon Guards (Carabiniers and Greys)
2nd Battalion, The Parachute Regiment
1st Battalion, The Highlanders (Seaforth, Gordons and Camerons)
1st Battalion, The Royal Regiment of Fusiliers
1st Battalion, The King's Own Royal Border Regiment
4th Battalion, The Parachute Regiment
Cambrai Company The West Midlands Regiment
Royal Welsh Regiment
1st Battalion, Royal Highland Fusiliers (Princess Margaret's Own Glasgow and Ayrshire Regiment)
National Support Element
1st Battalion, The Royal Scots (The Royal Regiment)
2 Battalion, REME
2 Logistic Support Regiment, Royal Logistic Corps
29 Close Support Medical Squadron
35 Battery Royal Artillery
Maritime Contribution
HMS Campbeltown (August 2005-February 2006)
HMS St Albans (February 2006-?)
HMS Bulwark (February 2006-?)

7th Roulement (Operation TELIC VIII)
From 10 May 2006 to 14 November 2006:
Senior British Military Representative and Deputy Commanding General, Multinational Force, Iraq: Lieutenant-General Robert Fry (May 2006 to September 2006)
Senior British Military Representative and Deputy Commanding General, Multinational Force, Iraq: Lieutenant-General Graeme Lamb (September 2006 to November 2006)
GOC Multi-National Division (South-East): Major General John Cooper (May 2006 to July 2006)
GOC Multi-National Division (South-East): Major General Richard Shirreff (July 2006 to November 2006)
20 Armoured Brigade
20 Armoured Brigade Headquarters and Signal Squadron (200)
12th Regiment Royal Artillery
33 Engineer Regiment
35 Engineer Regiment
1st The Queen's Dragoon Guards
The Queen's Royal Hussars
1st Battalion, Grenadier Guards
1st Battalion, The Princess of Wales's Royal Regiment (Queen's and Royal Hampshires)
2nd Battalion, The Royal Anglian Regiment
1st Battalion, The Devonshire and Dorset Light Infantry
1st Battalion, The Light Infantry
Lancastrian and Cumbrian Volunteers
King's and Cheshire Regiment
1 Logistic Support Regiment, Royal Logistic Corps
K (Hondeghem) Battery Royal Artillery

8th Roulement (Operation TELIC IX)
From 14 November 2006 to June 2007:
Senior British Military Representative and Deputy Commanding General, Multinational Force, Iraq: Lieutenant-General Graeme Lamb (November 2006 to June 2007)
GOC Multi-National Division (South-East): Major General Richard Shirreff (November 2006 to January 2007)
GOC Multi-National Division (South-East): Major General Jonathan Shaw (January 2007 to June 2007)
19 Light Brigade
19 Light Brigade Headquarters and Signal Squadron (209)
40th Regiment Royal Artillery
38 Engineer Regiment
The Queen's Royal Lancers
1st Royal Tank Regiment - H Sqn
2nd Royal Tank Regiment - EGYPT Sqn
1st Battalion, The Yorkshire Regiment (PWO)
2nd Battalion, The Duke of Lancaster's Regiment (King's Lancashire and Border)
1st Battalion, The Royal Green Jackets (renamed 2nd Battalion, The Rifles 1 Feb 2007)
1st Battalion, The Staffordshire Regiment (The Prince of Wales's)
2nd Battalion, The Royal Regiment of Fusiliers
2nd Battalion, The Light Infantry (renamed 3rd Battalion, The Rifles 1 Feb 2007)
The Black Watch, 3rd Battalion The Royal Regiment of Scotland
19 Combat Service Support Battalion
P Battery (The Dragon Troop) Royal Artillery (composite troop)
L Troop Honourable Artillery Company
Alamein Coy (FP) 7th Battalion, Royal Regiment of Scotland, (51st Highland)

9th Roulement (Operation TELIC X)
From June 2007 to December 2007:
Senior British Military Representative and Deputy Commanding General, Multinational Force, Iraq: Lieutenant-General Graeme Lamb (June 2007 to July 2007)
Senior British Military Representative and Deputy Commanding General, Multinational Force, Iraq: Lieutenant-General Bill Rollo (July 2007 to December 2007)
GOC Multi-National Division (South-East): Major General Jonathan Shaw (June 2007 to August 2007)
GOC Multi-National Division (South-East): Major General Graham Binns (August 2007 to December 2007)
Land component

Headquarters, 1 Mechanised Brigade 
215 Signal Squadron, Royal Signals
Two squadrons from the Household Cavalry Regiment
The King's Royal Hussars
Two squadrons from the 2nd Royal Tank Regiment, Badger and Cyclops
1st Battalion, Irish Guards
One company from 1st Battalion, The Royal Welsh
2nd Battalion, The Royal Welsh
4th Battalion, The Rifles
1st Regiment, Royal Horse Artillery
22nd Engineer Regiment
One squadron from 23rd Pioneer Regiment, Royal Logistic Corps
3rd Logistic Support Regiment, Royal Logistic Corps
One company from 6th Battalion, Royal Electrical and Mechanical Engineers
3rd Close Support Medical Regiment, Royal Army Medical Corps
158 Provost Company, 3rd Regiment, Royal Military Police
22 Battery, 32nd Regiment, Royal Artillery
34th Field Hospital, Royal Army Medical Corps

Sea component

HMS Cornwall
HMS Enterprise
RFA Bayleaf
Two Mine Countermeasures vessels
Contribution to the 60-man joint US-UK 'Naval Transition Team'

Air component

845 Naval Air Squadron (Sea King Mk 4)
Detachment from 652 Squadron, Army Air Corps (Lynx)
No. 1419 Flight RAF (Merlin)
No. 1 Squadron RAF Regiment
4th Force Protection Wing
No. 120 Squadron RAF/No. 201 Squadron RAF (Nimrod MR2)
No. 51 Squadron RAF (Nimrod R1)
814 Naval Air Squadron (Merlin)
No. 216 Squadron RAF (TriStar)
No. 32 (The Royal) Squadron RAF (BAe 125/BAe 146)
No. 617 Squadron RAF (Tornado GR4)
No. 23 Squadron RAF/No. 30 Squadron RAF (C-130J Hercules)
No. 101 Squadron RAF (VC10)

10th Roulement (Operation TELIC XI)
From December 2007 to June 2008:
Senior British Military Representative and Deputy Commanding General, Multinational Force, Iraq: Lieutenant-General Bill Rollo (December 2007 to March 2008)
Senior British Military Representative and Deputy Commanding General, Multinational Force, Iraq: Lieutenant-General John Cooper (March 2008 to June 2008)
GOC Multi-National Division (South-East): Major General Graham Binns (December 2007 to February 2008)
GOC Multi-National Division (South-East): Major General Barney White-Spunner (February 2008 to June 2008)
4 Mechanised Brigade
4 Mechanised Brigade Headquarters and Signal Squadron (204)
The Royal Dragoon Guards
D Battery, 3rd Regiment, Royal Horse Artillery
K Battery, 5th Regiment, Royal Artillery
21 Engineer Regiment
1st Battalion, Scots Guards
The Royal Scots Borderers, 1st Battalion The Royal Regiment of Scotland
1st Battalion, The Duke of Lancaster's Regiment (King's Lancashire and Border)
1st Battalion, The Mercian Regiment (Cheshires)
1st Battalion, Royal Electrical and Mechanical Engineers
115 Provost Company
1 (Close Support) Medical Regiment
12 Logistic Support Regiment
2nd Battalion Royal Welsh
I

11th Roulement (Operation TELIC XII)
From June 2008 to December 2008:
Senior British Military Representative and Deputy Commanding General, Multinational Force, Iraq: Lieutenant-General John Cooper (June 2008 to December 2008)
GOC Multi-National Division (South-East): Major General Barney White-Spunner (June 2008 to August 2008)
GOC Multi-National Division (South-East): Major General Andy Salmon (August 2008 to December 2008)
7 Armoured Brigade
7 Armoured Brigade Headquarters and Signal Squadron (207)
The Royal Scots Dragoon Guards (Carabiniers and Greys)
1st Battalion, The Royal Regiment of Fusiliers
The Highlanders, 4th Battalion The Royal Regiment of Scotland
2nd Battalion, The Royal Anglian Regiment
3rd Regiment, Royal Horse Artillery
32 Engineer Regiment
2 Logistic Support Regiment
3 (Close Support) Medical Regiment
2nd Battalion, Royal Electrical and Mechanical Engineers
111 Provost Company
 Elements of 25/170 Bty, Royal Artillery

12th Roulement (Operation TELIC XIII)
From December 2008 to 30 April 2009:
Senior British Military Representative and Deputy Commanding General, Multinational Force, Iraq: Lieutenant-General John Cooper (December 2008 to March 2009)
Senior British Military Representative and Deputy Commanding General, Multinational Force, Iraq: Lieutenant-General Chris Brown (March 2009 to April 2009)
GOC Multi-National Division (South-East): Major General Andy Salmon (December 2008 to March 2009)
20 Armoured Brigade
20 Armoured Brigade Headquarters and Signal Squadron (200)
The Queen's Royal Hussars (Queen's Own and Royal Irish)
1st Royal Tank Regiment - RHQ and T Sqn
1st Battalion, The Princess of Wales's Royal Regiment (Queen's and Royal Hampshires)
1st Battalion, The Yorkshire Regiment (14th/15th, 19th and 33rd/76th Foot) (Prince of Wales's Own)
5th Battalion, The Rifles
26 Regiment, Royal Artillery
35 Engineer Regiment
1 Logisitic Support Regiment
3rd Battalion, Royal Electrical and Mechanical Engineers
110 Provost Company

Aerial Assets
 847 Naval Air Squadron between October 2007 and February 2008 with the Lynx AH.9
 No. 651 Squadron, Army Air Corps between October 2004 and April 2009 with the Defender

See also

 List of United Kingdom Military installations used during Operation Telic

References

External links

Official Chronology on the National Archives

War on Terror orders of battle
Telic
 
2003 in Iraq
21st-century military history of the United Kingdom
British Army deployments
Wars involving the United Kingdom